Eucalyptus brookeriana, commonly known as Brooker's gum, is a tree species that is endemic to south-eastern Australia. It has rough, fibrous bark on the lower part of its trunk, smooth bark higher up, lance-shaped, egg-shaped or curved adult leaves, flower buds usually arranged in groups of seven, white flowers and cup-shaped, conical or bell-shaped fruit.

Description
Flowering occurs in summer and autumn and the flowers are white.

Taxonomy and naming
Eucalyptus brookeriana was first formally described in 1979 by Alan Maurice Gray from a specimen collected near Little Swanport in Tasmania and the description was published in the journal Australian Forest Research. The specific epithet (brookeriana) honours M.I.H. Brooker "who specialized in the taxonomy of the genus Eucalyptus.

Distribution and habitat
Brooker's gum has a disjunct distribution in Tasmania and Victoria. In Victoria it grows on the northern foothills of the Otway Ranges and in the Daylesford-Trentham area. It is widely distributed in Tasmania except in the south-west and occurs on King Island where it is the most abundant eucalypt. It grows on slopes and ridge tops but also near watercourses in wet forest and sometimes in or near rainforest.

Gallery

See also
List of Eucalyptus species

References

Flora of Tasmania
Flora of Victoria (Australia)
Trees of Australia
brookeriana
Myrtales of Australia
Plants described in 1979